Clavering hundred was a hundred – or geographical subdivision – comprising parishes and settlements in Essex and Norfolk. Hundreds were divisions of areas of land within shires or counties for administrative and judicial purposes – and for the collection of taxes.

In the Domesday Book of 1086, there were 27 places listed as part of the hundred. The two largest settlements within the hundred were Raveningham, with 115.5 households - according to the Domesday Book - and Clavering, with 80 households. Clavering had the largest taxable value within the hundred.

Locations in Essex
 Bentfield Bury
 Berden
 Bollington Hall
 Clavering
 Farnham
 Manuden
 Peyton Hall
 Pinchpools
 Ugley
 Pledgdon Hall

Locations in Norfolk
 Aldeby
 Ellingham
 Gillingham
 Haddiscoe
 Hales
 Heckingham
 Kirby Cane
 Norton Subcourse
 Raveningham
 Stockton
 Thurlton
 Toft Monks
 Wheatacre

Four further Clavering hundred settlements in Norfolk - Ierpestuna, Naruestuna, Thurketeliart and Torvestuna - are also mentioned in the Domesday Book, however these names no longer exist and the sites can only be located approximately.

See also
  List of Essex Hundreds in 1844
 Hundreds of Essex
 Hundreds of Norfolk

References

Hundreds of Essex
Hundreds of Norfolk